Benny Couto is a Portuguese professional footballer who plays as a left-back for  club Oldham Athletic.

Club career
Born in Portugal, Couto began his career with English club Oldham Athletic in their academy. In August 2021, he was called up by coach Keith Curle to participate in first team training after impressing coaches with the youth squad. On 31 August, Couto was named as a starter for Oldham Athletic in the EFL Trophy match against Salford City, playing the whole 90 minutes in the 1–0 victory. Shortly following his debut, he would go onto play the second half in the 7-0 away defeat to Brentford in the EFL league cup. Despite the Scoreline, he played well leading to his first League Two start days later. A 1-0 victory against Rochdale in the greater Manchester derby again performing well and winning favour with the Oldham Athletic fans. Throughout the festive period Couto continued to perform well. During this period he scored his first professional goal in a 3-1 defeat at home to Scunthorpe United.

Career statistics

References

External links
 Profile at Oldham Athletic

Living people
Footballers from Porto
Portuguese footballers
Association football defenders
Oldham Athletic A.F.C. players
Portuguese expatriate footballers
Expatriate footballers in England
Portuguese expatriate sportspeople in England
2003 births